Argein is a commune in the Ariège department in the  Occitanie region of south-western France.

The inhabitants of the commune are known as Argenois or Argenoises

Geography
Argein is located some 12 km south-west of Saint-Girons just a kilometre west of Audressein. Access to the commune is by the D618 road from Audressein in the east passing through the centre of the commune and the village and continuing west to Aucazein. Apart from the village there is also the hamlet of Viellot. The centre of the commune is the valley of the Bouigane oriented east–west where the village lies. In the valley there is some farmland however the rugged north and south of the commune is heavily forested.

The Buouigane river flows along the central valley east to join the Léz at Audressein. Some tributaries rise in the commune to join the Bouigane including the Ruisseau d'Auriech and the Ruisseau de Sol.

Neighbouring communes and villages

Administration

List of Successive Mayors

Mayors from 1929

Demography
In 2017 the commune had 194 inhabitants.

Sites and Monuments

The Parish Church of Saint Peter is an old Romanesque church from the 12th century and now an integral part of a church originally built in the 9th century. The original semicircular Apse forms the south aisle of the present building. There is an altar bearing a very ancient inscription (prior to the 4th century) depicted again in the south wall of the church. The Church contains many items that are registered as historical objects:
2 Altar Candlesticks (17th century)
2 Collection Plates (16th century)
A Thurible (17th century)
A Ciborium (1638)
A Chalice (17th century)
A Chalice with Paten (16th century)
A Statue: Saint Peter (18th century)
A Tabernacle (18th century)
An Altar, Retable, and Altar Dais (18th century)
A Monumental Painting on the southern exterior facade and interior walls (17th century)

Notable people linked to the commune
Honoré Laffont, born 6 October 1901 at Argein and died on 14 February 1975. An international Rugby player (1st time in 1926 against Wales). He was twice a finalist in the championship of France with RC Narbonne (1932 and 1933). He played scrum half (1.65m, 62 kg). He was also coach for RC Narbonne.

See also
Communes of the Ariège department

References

External links
Argein on the National Geographic Institute website 
Argein on Géoportail, National Geographic Institute (IGN) website 
Argein on the 1750 Cassini Map

Communes of Ariège (department)